North Dakota Highway 8 (ND 8) is a  north–south state highway in North Dakota, United States. The highway is split into two segments. The highway was originally continuous but was separated by the formation of Lake Sakakawea in the 1950s.

Route description

Major intersections

See also

 List of state highways in North Dakota
 List of highways numbered 8

References

External links

 The North Dakota Highways Page by Chris Geelhart
 North Dakota Signs by Mark O'Neil

008